Rhodopteriana obscura is a moth in the family Eupterotidae. It was described by Per Olof Christopher Aurivillius in 1893. It is found in the Democratic Republic of the Congo and Ghana.

References

Moths described in 1893
Janinae